Majdan may refer to:

People
 Dušan Majdán (born 1987), Slovak racewalker
 Joanna Majdan-Gajewska (born 1988), Polish chess player (née Majdan)
 Juraj Majdan (born 1991), Slovak ice hockey player
 Radosław Majdan (born 1972), Polish former football goalkeeper
 Vladimír Majdan (born 1999), Slovak footballer

Places

Poland
 Majdan, Białystok County, a village
 Majdan, Garwolin County, a village
 Majdan, Gmina Łochów, a village
 Majdan, Gmina Stoczek, a village
 Majdan, Gmina Wierzbno, a village
 Majdan, Gmina Wojsławice, a village
 Majdan, Gmina Żmudź, a village
 Majdan, Hajnówka County, a settlement
 Majdan, Hrubieszów County, a village
 Majdan, Janów Lubelski County, a village
 Majdan, Lesko County, a hamlet
 Majdan, Mińsk County, a village
 Majdan, Ostrołęka County, a village
 Majdan, Otwock County, a village
 Majdan, Suwałki County, a village
 Majdan, Tomaszów Lubelski County, a settlement
 Majdan, Warmian-Masurian Voivodeship, a settlement
 Majdan, Wołomin County, a village

Serbia
 Majdan (Gornji Milanovac), a village
 Majdan (Novi Kneževac), a village
 Majdan (Serbian mountain)

Elsewhere
 Majdan (Fojnica), Bosnia and Herzegovina, a village
 Majdan (Kladanj), Bosnia and Herzegovina, a village
 Majdan, Zavidovići, Bosnia and Herzegovina, a village
 Majdan (mountain in Kosovo)

See also
 Maidan (disambiguation)